Olga Yuryevna Krivosheyeva (born May 15, 1961 in Almaty, Kazakhstan) is a former Soviet competitive volleyball player and Olympic gold medalist.

References

External links
 

Soviet women's volleyball players
Olympic volleyball players of the Soviet Union
Volleyball players at the 1988 Summer Olympics
Olympic gold medalists for the Soviet Union
1961 births
Sportspeople from Almaty
Living people
Olympic medalists in volleyball
Medalists at the 1988 Summer Olympics